National Education Day can refer to:
Education and Sharing Day
National Education Day (India)
National Education Day (Indonesia)
MasterCard Money Matters National Education Day, part of National Payroll Week

See also
Teachers' Day